Neston Urban District was an urban district in Cheshire, England and previously known as Neston and Parkgate Urban District (1894-1933). 
It was the local authority for Neston and Parkgate, in the south-west of the Wirral Peninsula.

Several civil parishes of the disbanded Wirral Rural District were added in 1933. These were: Ness and parts of Burton, Eastham, Puddington, Raby, Thornton Hough and Willaston.

Neston Town Hall was built in 1889 for Neston and Parkgate Local Board. On the formation of the urban district it was used as the council's headquarters until 1974. Since its abolition, the town hall has remained in community use and is available for hire. The building has been extensively refurbished and is now also used by Neston Town Council.

On 1 April 1974, under the Local Government Act 1972, the urban district was abolished and its area absorbed into the Borough of Ellesmere Port and Neston.

References

External links
The National Archives: Neston Urban District Council Records
Neston Past: the early history of Neston Town Hall

Neston
History of Cheshire
Districts of England abolished by the Local Government Act 1972
Former districts of Cheshire
Former non-metropolitan districts of Cheshire
Urban districts of England